Fader Bergström, stäm upp och klinga (Father Bergström, start playing and sounding) is one of the Swedish poet and performer Carl Michael Bellman's songs, from his 1790 collection, Fredman's Epistles, where it is No. 63. Bergström was a musician, and the song celebrates dancing and drinking late into the evening. The song, written in 1773, was revised heavily to make it suitable for publication. The initial version, naming Movitz not Bergström as the musician, was an attack on an over-zealous priest who had caused Bellman to be summonsed for an earlier poem that had joked about salvation. The song has been recorded by Bellman interpreters including Fred Åkerström, Fredrik Berg, and Rolf Leanderson.

Context

Song

Music and verse form 

The song is marked "Diktad midt i veckan" (Dictated midweek); it was written in September 1773. The melody is in the key of D major, marked Menuetto (a courtly dance), and in [[ Triple metre| time]]. There are two long verses, each of 24 lines. The rhyming pattern is the shifting BBBC-DDDC-EEEC-ABAB-CDCD-EEED. The melody was derived from a minuet with the "timbre" label "Minuet af  d. ä." in 's 1788 Bobis bröllop.

Lyrics 

The lyrics have been translated into English by Eva Toller. Bergström was a musician, playing a wind instrument for people's name days in the Katarina Church area of Stockholm, and the song celebrates dancing and drinking late into the evening. The last few lines run:

Reception and legacy

Bellman's biographer Carina Burman records that the original 1773 version differed in many ways from the final 1790 text. It was originally Movitz who was playing, not Bergström; and the second verse was completely rewritten. She explains that an over-zealous priest, Nils Jacob Nymansson of Ulrika Eleonora Church on Kungsholmen, had been angered by one of Bellman's poems which likened the comfort offered by a beautiful girl, when  Bellman was frightened by a thunderstorm, to salvation. That merely made the Age of Enlightenment laugh, but for the church it was an insult. The King had announced the freedom of the press, but the church considered itself an exception. Bellman was summonsed to appear before the
Chancellor of Justice, but fortunately the King found the matter ridiculous. Bellman, a mild-mannered man, was sufficiently annoyed to write an attack upon Nymansson, in the form of the epistle. The first verse mentioned prostitution, a seller of lemons no longer carrying a heavy basket of fruit, but "Now among Barons / She dances herself warm". Burman suggests that this frank description among the otherwise playful lines was perhaps a hint of Bellman's anger. The second verse, she writes, paints a picture of chaos. It describes Nymansson as the biblical sea-monster or crocodile Leviathan, who with unrestrained lust visits brothels and puts street-girls up "against planks and walls" in Stockholm's alleys to do as he likes with them. Meanwhile, the verse states that the priest condemns Fredman's (aka Bellman's) "tender love" for his girl Iris. Movitz is exhorted to do as the pope had done (with a papal bull in July 1773) and drive out the harmful priests. Burman comments that the epistle's sharp tone was nothing like Bellman's usual style; the words were strong for an age where people were readily punished for blasphemy. Finally, according to the 1773 version, the priest falls over, but "it doesn't matter". None of this appeared in the final printed version.

Epistle 63 has been recorded by Fred Åkerström on his 1974 album Glimmande nymf, by Fredrik Berg on his 2014 album Angående Fredrik Bergs tolkning av C M Bellman, where it is the first track, and by Rolf Leanderson on his 2012 album Carl Michael Bellman: Songs & Epistles in Swedish.

References

Sources

 
 
 
  (contains the most popular Epistles and Songs, in Swedish, with sheet music)
  (with facsimiles of sheet music from first editions in 1790, 1791)

External links 

 Text of Epistle 63

1790 compositions
Swedish songs
Fredmans epistlar